Arachis diogoi (syn. Arachis chacoense Krapov. & W.Gregory, Arachis villosa Benth. subsp. diogoi (Hoehne) A.Chev.) is a perennial herb found in Africa, Indian Ocean and South America. This plant is cited as gene sources for research in plant biology of peanut (Arachis hypogaea).

External links
International Legume Database & Information Service: Arachis diogoi

diogoi
Flora of Africa
Flora of South America